The Green Dragon is a grade II listed public house in St Albans Road, Dancers Hill, on the road north from Chipping Barnet. It dates from around 1830 and is built of brick with a slate roof.

References

External links
 http://www.highlivingbarnet.com/the-green-dragon/
 http://www.thegreendragonbarnet.co.uk/

Grade II listed pubs in Hertfordshire